Cischweinfia is a genus of flowering plants from the orchid family, Orchidaceae. It was named after Harvard orchidologist Charles Schweinfurth. It has eleven currently recognized species, all native to Central America and northwestern South America.

Species 
 Cischweinfia colombiana Garay - Colombia
 Cischweinfia dasyandra (Rchb.f.) Dressler & N.H.Williams - Colombia, Ecuador, Panama, Costa Rica
 Cischweinfia donrafae Dressler & Dalström - Costa Rica
 Cischweinfia jarae Dodson & D.E.Benn.-  Ecuador, Peru, Bolivia
 Cischweinfia nana Dressler - Panama
 Cischweinfia parva (C.Schweinf.) Dressler & N.H.Williams - Ecuador, Peru, Bolivia, Colombia
 Cischweinfia platychila Garay - Colombia
 Cischweinfia popowiana Königer - Ecuador
 Cischweinfia pusilla (C.Schweinf.) Dressler & N.H.Williams - Colombia, Panama, Costa Rica
 Cischweinfia pygmaea (Pupulin, J.Valle & G.Merino) M.W.Chase - Ecuador
 Cischweinfia rostrata Dressler & N.H.Williams - Colombia, Ecuador

See also 
 List of Orchidaceae genera

References

External links 

Oncidiinae genera
Oncidiinae